An off-season Atlantic hurricane is a recorded tropical or subtropical cyclone that existed in the Atlantic basin outside of the official Atlantic hurricane season. The National Oceanic and Atmospheric Administration currently defines the season as occurring between June 1 and November 30 each calendar year, which is when 97% of all Atlantic tropical cyclones occur. Peak activity is known to be between August and October. , there have been 91 off-season cyclones in the Atlantic hurricane database, which began in 1851. In addition, there were six storms before 1851, and one hurricane in 1863 that is not part of the official database.

Off-season storms are most likely to occur in May, with approximately 60% of such storms occurring during that month. Occasionally, however, storms develop in or persist into December. The most recent to do so was an unnamed subtropical Storm in 2013. Off-season cyclones are most likely to occur in the central to western Atlantic Ocean, and most do not make landfall. Of the storms that did strike land, most affected areas surrounding the Caribbean Sea. Cumulatively, at least 441 deaths occurred due to the storms, primarily on the islands of Hispaniola and Cuba; a tropical storm in May 1948 struck the Dominican Republic to become the deadliest off-season storm. However, an unofficial hurricane in 1863 killed 110 people, in a shipwreck off Florida and on land. In addition, the strongest off-season cyclone to make landfall in the United States was Tropical Storm Beryl in May of 2012, which made landfall near Jacksonville Beach, Florida with  winds. The most recent off-season storm is Tropical Storm Ana in May 2021.

Background
In 1938, the United States Weather Bureau began issuing tropical cyclone warnings as a collaborative observation network for cities along the U.S. coastline, and the season was defined between June 15 and November 15. In 1964, the season was extended to begin on June 1 and end on November 30, which remains the official length of the season. About 97% of all tropical cyclones form within this time span, and activity usually peaks between August and October. After Tropical Storm Ana formed in May 2015, former American Meteorological Society president Marshall Shepherd used Twitter to question whether the season should begin earlier. James Franklin of the National Hurricane Center believed there was little advantage to changing it because of the rarity of off-season storms, noting that May storms only formed on average once every six years since the advent of satellite imagery. Franklin opined that the season could begin on May 15 with little difficulty, coinciding with the beginning of the Pacific hurricane season, but an earlier start would be costlier and interfere with off-season work.

Chronology
Tropical cyclones have been named in the Atlantic since the 1947 Atlantic hurricane season, and subtropical cyclones have been recognized in HURDAT since 1968. The National Hurricane Center issues names for tropical and subtropical cyclones once their winds reach . Before 1950, storms were numbered based on their appearance in the Atlantic hurricane database; tropical depressions were unnumbered. Storms before 1851 are unofficial and are not part of the official Atlantic hurricane best track. In addition, a hurricane from May 1863, labeled "Amanda", is included after being rediscovered in 2013.

The wind speeds listed are maximum one-minute average sustained winds, and the pressure is the minimum barometric pressure; tropical cyclones listed with N/A under pressure indicates there is no known estimated pressure. For deaths, "None" indicates that there were no reports of fatalities; death tolls listed as "several" mean there were fatalities reported, but an exact total is unavailable. For both deaths and damage, N/A refers to no known total, although such storms may have impacted land. The damage totals are the United States dollar of the year of the storm.

|-
|  ||  || bgcolor=#| ||  ||  || Cuba ||  ||  ||
|-
|  ||  || bgcolor=#| ||  ||   || Cuba ||  ||  || 
|-
|  ||  || bgcolor=#| ||  ||  || Cuba ||  || ||
|-
|  ||  || bgcolor=#| ||  ||  || Eastern Caribbean Sea ||  ||  ||
|-
|  ||  || bgcolor=#| ||  ||  || Cuba, United States East Coast ||  ||  ||
|-
|  ||  || bgcolor=#| ||  ||  || Jamaica ||  ||  ||
|-
|  ||  || bgcolor=#| ||  ||  || Florida ||  ||  || 
|-
|  ||  || bgcolor=#| ||  ||  || Caribbean Sea ||  ||  ||
|-
|  ||  || bgcolor=#| ||  ||  || Lesser Antilles, Puerto Rico, Jamaica ||  ||  ||
|-
|  ||  || bgcolor=#| ||  || ≤ || Atlantic Canada ||  ||  ||
|-
|  ||  || bgcolor=#| ||  || ≤ || Jamaica, Cuba, Bahamas ||  ||  ||
|-
|  ||  || bgcolor=#| ||  ||  || Bahamas ||  ||  ||
|-
|  ||  || bgcolor=#| ||  ||  || Central Atlantic Ocean ||  ||  ||
|-
|  ||  || bgcolor=#| ||  ||  || Lesser Antilles, Colombia, Nicaragua ||  ||  ||
|-
|  ||  || bgcolor=#| ||  ||  || Western Atlantic Ocean ||  ||  ||
|-
|  ||  || bgcolor=#| ||  ||  || Cuba ||  ||  ||
|-
|  ||  || bgcolor=#| ||  ||  || Haiti, Cuba ||  ||  ||
|-
|  ||  || bgcolor=#| ||  || || Central Atlantic Ocean ||  ||  ||
|-
|  ||  || bgcolor=#| ||  || ≤ || Lesser Antilles ||  ||  ||
|-
|  ||  || bgcolor=#| ||  ||  || North Carolina ||  ||  ||
|-
|  ||  || bgcolor=#| ||  ||  || Central Atlantic Ocean ||  ||  ||
|-
|  ||  || bgcolor=#| ||  ||  || Central Atlantic Ocean ||  ||  ||
|-
|  ||  || bgcolor=#| ||  ||  || Haiti, Cuba ||  ||  ||
|-
|  ||  || bgcolor=#| ||  ||   || Central Atlantic ||  ||  ||
|-
|  ||  || bgcolor=#| ||  ||  || Northern Atlantic Ocean ||  ||  ||
|-
|  ||  || bgcolor=#| ||  ||  || Central Atlantic Ocean ||  ||  ||
|-
|  ||  || bgcolor=#| ||  ||  || Cuba, United States East Coast ||  ||  ||
|-
|  ||  || bgcolor=#| ||  ||  || Nicaragua ||  ||  ||
|-
|  ||  || bgcolor=#| ||  ||  || Cuba, United States East CoastBermuda, Azores ||  ||  ||
|-
|  ||  || bgcolor=#| ||  ||  || Dominican Republic ||  ||  ||
|-
|  ||  || bgcolor=#| ||  ||  || Yucatán Peninsula ||  ||  ||
|-
|  ||  || bgcolor=#| ||  ||  || Hispaniola ||  ||  ||
|-
|  ||  || bgcolor=#| ||  ||  || Texas ||  ||  ||
|-
|  ||  || bgcolor=#| ||  ||  || Eastern Atlantic Ocean ||  ||  ||
|-
|  ||  || bgcolor=#| ||  ||  || Eastern Atlantic Ocean ||  ||  ||
|-
|  ||  || bgcolor=#| ||  || < || Western Atlantic Ocean ||  ||  ||
|-
|  ||  || bgcolor=#| ||  ||  || Dominican Republic ||  ||  ||
|-
|  ||  || bgcolor=#| ||  ||  || Western Atlantic Ocean ||   ||  || 
|-
|  ||  || bgcolor=#| ||  ||  || Bahamas, North Carolina ||  ||  ||
|-
|  ||  || bgcolor=#| || ||  (29.77 inHg) || Western Atlantic Ocean ||  ||  ||
|-
|  ||  || bgcolor=#| ||  ||  || Azores ||  ||  || 
|-
|  ||  || bgcolor=#| ||  ||  || Florida ||  ||  ||
|-
|  ||  || bgcolor=#| ||  ||  || Cuba, Florida ||  ||  ||
|-
|  ||  || bgcolor=#| ||  || ≤ || Central Atlantic Ocean ||  ||  ||
|-
|  ||  || bgcolor=#| || ||  || Lesser Antilles ||  ||  ||
|-
|  ||  || bgcolor=#| || ||  || Central Atlantic Ocean ||  ||  ||
|-
|  ||  || bgcolor=#| || ||  || Northeastern Atlantic Ocean ||  ||  ||
|-
|  ||  || bgcolor=#| ||  || ≤ || North Carolina ||  ||  ||
|-
|  ||  || bgcolor=#| ||  ||  || Lesser Antilles ||  ||  ||
|-
|  ||  || bgcolor=#| ||  ||  || Western Atlantic Ocean ||  ||  ||
|-
|  ||  || bgcolor=#| ||  ||  || United States Gulf Coast ||  ||  ||
|-
|  ||  || bgcolor=#| ||  ||  || Western Atlantic Ocean ||  ||  ||
|-
|  || || bgcolor=#| ||  ||  || Southeastern United States ||  ||  || 
|-
|  ||  || bgcolor=#| ||  ||  || Western Atlantic Ocean ||  ||  ||
|-
|  ||  || bgcolor=#| ||  ||  || Cuba, Florida ||  ||  ||
|-
|  ||  || bgcolor=#| ||  ||  || Western Atlantic Ocean ||  ||  || 
|-
|  ||  || bgcolor=#| ||  ||  || Southeastern United States ||  ||  ||
|-
|  ||  || bgcolor=#| ||  ||  || Central Atlantic Ocean || || ||
|-
|  ||  || bgcolor=#| ||  ||  || Central Atlantic Ocean || || ||
|-
|  ||  || bgcolor=#| ||  ||  || Belize, Mexico, CubaJamaica, United States Gulf Coast ||  ||  ||
|-
|  ||  || bgcolor=#| ||  ||  || Northeast Atlantic Ocean ||  ||  ||
|-
|  ||  || bgcolor=#| ||  ||  || Florida ||  ||  ||
|-
|  ||  || bgcolor=#| ||  ||  || Central Atlantic Ocean ||  ||  ||
|-
|  ||  || bgcolor=#| ||  ||  || Cuba, Bahamas ||  ||  ||
|-
|  ||  || bgcolor=#| ||  ||  || Hispaniola ||  ||  ||
|-
|  ||  || bgcolor=#| ||  ||  || Western Caribbean ||  ||  ||
|-
|  ||  || bgcolor=#| ||  ||  || Bahamas ||  ||  ||
|-
|  ||  || bgcolor=#| ||  ||  || Cuba ||  ||  ||
|-
|  ||  || bgcolor=#| ||  ||  || Cuba ||  ||  ||
|-
|  ||  || bgcolor=#| ||  ||  || Cuba, Florida || || ||
|-
|  ||  || bgcolor=#| ||  ||  || Central Atlantic Ocean || || ||
|-
|  ||  || bgcolor=#| ||  ||  || Cuba, Florida ||  ||  ||
|-
|  ||  || bgcolor=#| ||  ||  || Northeastern Atlantic Ocean || || ||
|-
|  ||  || bgcolor=#| ||  ||  || Western Atlantic Ocean || || ||
|-
|  ||  || bgcolor=#| ||  ||  || Florida ||  ||  ||
|-
|  ||  || bgcolor=#| ||  ||  || Hispaniola ||  ||  ||
|-
|  ||  || bgcolor=#| ||  ||  || Eastern Atlantic Ocean || || ||
|-
|  ||  || bgcolor=#| ||  ||  || Central Atlantic Ocean ||  ||  ||
|-
|  ||  || bgcolor=#| ||  ||  || Central Atlantic Ocean ||  || ||
|-
|  ||  || bgcolor=#| ||  ||  || Central Atlantic Ocean ||  ||  ||
|-
|  ||  || bgcolor=#| ||  ||  || Southeast United States coast ||  ||  ||
|-
|  ||  || bgcolor=#| ||  ||  || Greater Antilles ||  ||  ||
|-
|  ||  || bgcolor=#| ||  ||  || Belize, Yucatán Peninsula ||  ||  ||
|-
|  ||  || bgcolor=#| ||  ||  || Western Atlantic Ocean ||  || ||
|-
|  ||  || bgcolor=#| ||  ||  || South Carolina, North Carolina, Georgia ||  ||  ||
|-
|  ||  || bgcolor=#| ||  ||  || Florida, Georgia, Cuba, The Bahamas ||  ||  ||
|-
|  ||  || bgcolor=#| ||  ||  || Azores ||  ||  ||
|-
|  ||  || bgcolor=#| ||  ||  || Southeastern United States ||  ||  ||
|-
|  ||  || bgcolor=#| ||  ||  || Bermuda, Azores ||  ||  ||
|-
|  ||  || bgcolor=#| ||  ||  || Southeastern United States, The Bahamas ||  || ||
|-
|  ||  || bgcolor=#| ||  ||  || Central Atlantic Ocean ||  || ||
|-
|  ||  || bgcolor=#| ||  ||  || Yucatán Peninsula, Cuba, Southeastern United States ||  || ||
|-
|  ||  || bgcolor=#| ||  ||  || Bermuda ||  ||  || 
|-
|  ||  || bgcolor=#| ||  ||  || Florida, Bahamas, North Carolina, Bermuda ||  || ||
|-
|  ||  || bgcolor=#| ||  ||  || The Bahamas, Florida, Georgia, The Carolinas, Virginia, West Virginia, Pennsylvania  ||  || ||
|-
|  ||  || bgcolor=#| ||  ||  || Bermuda  ||  || ||
|}

Records and statistics

In the official Atlantic hurricane database, which dates back to 1851, the first storm to occur outside of the current season was in 1865 in the Caribbean Sea. In the database, 86 tropical or subtropical cyclones have existed between December and May, most recently Ana in 2021. In addition, there were at least five storms in May and another in December before the start of the official database.

Storms were most likely to occur in May, followed by December. Out of all recorded storms in the database, only one cyclone was reported in the month of March; the 1908 March hurricane, as well as one tropical storm in February, which was the 1952 Groundhog Day Storm. In addition, only three tropical or subtropical cyclones formed in April – a subtropical storm in 1992, Tropical Storm Ana of 2003, and Arlene of 2017. A hurricane in 1938, a tropical storm in 1951, a subtropical storm in 1978, and Hurricane Alex of 2016 occurred in January. Of all cyclones during the off-season, Hurricane Lili in 1984 lasted the longest, for a total of 12 days. Hurricane Epsilon, which formed in November, maintained hurricane status for five days in December 2005, longer than any other storm in December; the previous record was two and a half days, set by Hurricane Lili in 1984. Additionally, Hurricane Alice in 1954–1955 and Tropical Storm Zeta in 2005–2006 were the only recorded cyclones to have spanned two calendar years.

Of the off-season storms that struck land, portions of the Caribbean were affected most. Hurricane Alice was the only of the cyclones to strike land as a hurricane, doing so to islands in the northern Lesser Antilles; it caused locally heavy rainfall and moderate damage. No hurricanes have ever made landfall in the United States during December, although at one point a storm in 1925 was believed to have done this. One century earlier, a hurricane formed in the western Caribbean and struck Florida on or before June 3, which was the earliest date for a United States hurricane landfall. However, there is an unofficial hurricane in 1863 that struck the Florida panhandle, killing 110 people. The deadliest official off-season storm was a tropical storm in May 1948, which killed 80 people in the Dominican Republic.

The year with the most off-season storms was 1887, with a total of five existing in the off-season. The 1951 season had four, one of which a depression. Several others had three tropical cyclones, of which only 2003 had three tropical storms. The 1908 and 1951 seasons were the only ones with two hurricanes forming in the off-season. In eight seasons, there were storms both prior to the start of the season as well as after the season ended, those being 1887, 1911, 1951, 1953, 1954, 1970, 2003, and 2007; all but 1911 had tropical cyclones of at least tropical storm status before and after the season. The longest streak of consecutive years featuring at least one pre-season storm was 7, from 2015 through 2021.

Monthly statistics

See also

List of off-season Australian region tropical cyclones
List of off-season Pacific hurricanes
List of off-season South Pacific tropical cyclones

References

External links
Atlantic hurricane database (HURDAT)

 List
Lists of Atlantic hurricanes